Jonathan Miles (born 29 March 1993) is an English footballer who plays as a goalkeeper for Haringey Borough who previously had come through the Tottenham Hotspur youth system.

Club career

Tottenham Hotspur
Born in Colchester, England, Miles first joined Tottenham Hotspur as an under-9 player, joining from non-league club Buckhurst Hill. He played eight times in the 2011–12 NextGen Series. He also made 11 appearances for the Spurs Under-18s in 2010–11 as he shared goalkeeping duties with Jordan Archer. Miles signed a 1-year professional contract with Tottenham Hotspur at the end of the 2012–13 season, he signed a year extension for 2013–14, and was offered a new one-year deal with the club for 2014–15.

Loan to Dagenham & Redbridge
On 28 March 2013, Miles joined Dagenham & Redbridge on loan until the end of the season. On his 20th birthday, 29 March 2013, he made his League debut and kept a clean sheet against Barnet. On 1 April 2013, he played again losing 4–2 against Bristol Rovers.

Ebbsfleet United
Miles is now signed with Ebbsfleet United for the 2015–2016 season.

Later career
At the end of May 2019, Miles signed with Ramsgate who he played for on loan in 2017. He made six appearances for the club, before joining Ramsgate in October 2019. On 5 January 2020, he joined Haringey Borough.

Career statistics

References

External links

1993 births
Living people
Sportspeople from Colchester
English footballers
Tottenham Hotspur F.C. players
Dagenham & Redbridge F.C. players
Whitehawk F.C. players
Ebbsfleet United F.C. players
Concord Rangers F.C. players
Gosport Borough F.C. players
Margate F.C. players
Ramsgate F.C. players
Haringey Borough F.C. players
English Football League players
National League (English football) players
Association football goalkeepers